Shihu is a town in Tonghua County, Jilin province, China. , it administers Huimin Residential Community and the following three villages:
Gongyi Village
Laoling Village
Yong'an Village

References

Township-level divisions of Jilin
Tonghua County